Gana Bayarsaikhan is a Mongolian model, TV and film actress best known for her role as "the girl" in the 2019 film Waiting for the Barbarians and as Tuva Olsen in the 2020 Sky TV series Intelligence.

Early life and career

Bayarsaikhan was born and raised in Ulaanbaatar, Mongolia. She started her career as a model, and has appeared in Schön and Where magazines. After finishing drama training, she took a coaching programme to help her accept her own speech and accent for auditions.

Bayarsaikhan made her screen acting debut as the android Jade in the 2015 film  Ex Machina alongside Domhnall Gleeson. and secured small roles as Khutu in Ben-Hur (2016) and 
in Wonder Woman (2017).

Bayarsaikhan purportedly became the first Mongolian actress ever to play a lead role in a Hollywood movie when she was cast as "the girl" in the 2019 film Waiting for the Barbarians, which co-starred Johnny Depp and Mark Rylance, and premiered at the 76th Venice International Film Festival on 6 September 2019, to which Bayarsaikhan attended.
Director Ciro Guerra described how Bayarsaikhan and the other 14 Mongolian actors  shared their culture, enriching the film in the process.

Bayarsaikhan plays Tuva Olsen, a main character in the 2020 Sky TV series Intelligence, alongside David Schwimmer and Nick Mohammed. Series 2 of Intelligence was released in 2021.

Filmography

Film

Television

References

External links

Profile Models: Gana Bayarsaikhan
ScottMarshall Agency: Gana Bayarsaikhan

Living people
Mongolian film actresses
Mongolian actresses
Year of birth missing (living people)
People from Ulaanbaatar